Christopher Ryan Goss (born August 17, 1958) is an American record producer and musician. Best known for producing records for Kyuss and Queens of the Stone Age, he is regarded as an important figure in the development of stoner rock and desert rock genres. Goss is also the lead singer and guitarist of the hard rock band Masters of Reality.

Recording career
As well as being the founding (and only constant) member of influential desert rock outfit Masters of Reality, Goss is also well known for his production work on albums by Kyuss and Queens of the Stone Age. Largely credited as the Godfather of desert rock, Goss has on several occasions played down the importance of his role in this musical movement. In 1999, he stated, "I can't make any claim at all to inventing desert rock, or stoner rock, or whatever you want to call it. I make rock n roll records, and hopefully try to make the listener feel like I did when I heard my favourite music."
 
In 2004, Goss highlighted exactly what kind of music he created, "There's a bunch of weirdos that I work with all the time, and we make what I call 'out of whack' Rock records. That's what I do. When people want an 'out of whack' weird Rock record, they call me, and I take an 'out of whack' amount of money to do it, and I'm glad to be there. It's cool."

In late 2004, Goss had to be hospitalized due to severe internal infection and the European leg of his tour in support of the new Masters of Reality album Give Us Barabbas had to be postponed indefinitely. After his recuperation, he joined Jeordie White and Zach Hill to release I Got a Brand New Egg Layin' Machine, a "mini LP" released under the name Goon Moon.

Goss appeared with his longtime friend Josh Homme of Queens of the Stone Age as "The 5:15ers" at the "winter edition" of ArthurFest, performing an intimate set which was "crafted in less than a month as the duo was a rather late addition to the Arthurball line-up as Sunday's headliner". Continuing with Goon Moon, Goss, White and Hill released a full-length album in May 2007 entitled Licker's Last Leg containing many guest artists synonymous with the desert rock scene.

Goss also joined Queens of the Stone Age and Billy Gibbons to perform "Burn the Witch" on Late Night with Conan O'Brien.

In 2013, regarding Josh Homme's supposed decision to sequence the album Era Vulgaris using songs originated in a "Los Angeles studio without a single thing written, just to see what it was like to force songs out of his psyche", Goss was quoted saying: "I've seen him do that before with the Desert Sessions but never with Queens. The Queens of the Stone Age is a business, where he's the CEO. It's not run the same."

In 2014, filming completed in Las Vegas for Death in the Desert, a full-length movie for which Goss wrote an original song titled "Only the Lonely", performed by singer Roxy Saint, who plays the character Corey in the full-length film, which is directed and produced by Saint's husband, Josh Evans. It stars Michael Madsen, Shayla Beesley and Paz de la Huerta. The movie is inspired by the book Death in the Desert by Cathy Scott, with the screenplay by John Steppling.

Selected discography
Throughout his career, Goss has worked with a wide range of musicians in various genres.

1989: Masters of Reality by Masters of Reality
1992: Blues for the Red Sun by Kyuss
1993: Sunrise on the Sufferbus by Masters of Reality
1994: Welcome to Sky Valley by Kyuss
1994: All of Us by I Love You
1995: ...And the Circus Leaves Town by Kyuss
1995: Marie Mozege by Les Super Stars
1996: Dust by Screaming Trees
1996: Leave the Story Untold by Soulwax
1996: Daaly by Thione Seck
1996: Tiny Music... Songs from the Vatican Gift Shop by Stone Temple Pilots
1996: Amusing the Amazing by Slo Burn
1997: How High the Moon: Live at the Viper Room by Masters of Reality
1998: Holiday Man by The Flys
1998: Gaslight by 30 Odd Foot of Grunts
1998: Volumes 3 & 4 by Desert Sessions
1998: Queens of the Stone Age by Queens of the Stone Age
1999: Kimi No Oto Ga Kikoeru Basho by Bird
1999: Welcome to the Western Lodge by Masters of Reality
2000: Spirit\Light\Speed by Ian Astbury
2000: Cocaine Rodeo by Mondo Generator
2000: Rated R by Queens of the Stone Age
2000: Muchas Gracias: The Best of Kyuss by Kyuss
2000: Outta My Way by The Flys
2001: Toasted by Fatso Jetson
2001: Volumes 7 & 8 by The Desert Sessions
2001: Deep in the Hole by Masters of Reality
2002: Songs for the Deaf by Queens of the Stone Age
2003: Flak 'n' Flight by Masters of Reality
2003: Tell Them Hi by Campfire Girls
2003: Vol. 9&10 by The Desert Sessions
2003: Atomic Ritual by Nebula
2003: Here Comes That Weird Chill by Mark Lanegan Band
2003: The Underground Personality Tapes by Roxy Saint
2004: Never, Never Land by UNKLE
2004: Give Us Barabbas by Masters of Reality
2004: Bubblegum by the Mark Lanegan Band
2004: Auf der Maur by Melissa Auf der Maur
2004: Demon Crossing by Yellow #5
2004: Mister Mental by The Eighties Matchbox B-Line Disaster
2005: I Got a Brand New Egg Layin' Machine by Goon Moon
2005: Lullabies to Paralyze by Queens of the Stone Age
2005: Ocean of Confusion: Songs of Screaming Trees 1989–1996 by Screaming Trees
2007: Licker's Last Leg by Goon Moon
2007: The Cool by Lupe Fiasco
2007: Era Vulgaris by Queens of the Stone Age
2007: War Stories by UNKLE
2008: It's OK to be Happy by Smith & Pyle
2008: Neptune by The Duke Spirit
2008: More Stories by UNKLE
2008: End Titles... Stories for Film by UNKLE
2009: Pine/Cross Dover by Masters of Reality
2010: Out of Our Minds by Melissa Auf der Maur
2010: Where Did the Night Fall by UNKLE
2010: Everyman and Woman Is a Star by The Cult
2011: Enjoy Your Psychosis by Drums Are for Parades
2014: Sonic Highways by Foo Fighters
2016: Your Desert My Mind by The Mutants
2020: Lavender Blues by Big Scenic Nowhere

See also
Goon Moon
Masters of Reality
Palm Desert Scene
The Desert Sessions

References

External links
Chris Goss' homepage (archived)
2006 Chris Goss interview with Brian D. Holland of Modernguitars.com.
 

1958 births
Living people
American record producers
Goon Moon members
Queens of the Stone Age members
American rock singers
American rock guitarists
American male guitarists
American hard rock musicians
American male singer-songwriters
American singer-songwriters
20th-century American guitarists
Masters of Reality members